G.K.M Tamil Kumaran, is an Indian Film Producer of Tamil descent who specializes in Tamil cinema. 

Kumaran is the son of Govindapadi Kanthasami Mani, leader of the P.M.K political party in Tamil Nadu. He has produced the film Endrendrum Punnagai (2013).

Filmography
Producer
Endrendrum Punnagai (2013)
Actor
Naachiyaar (2018)

References

Living people
Film producers from Tamil Nadu
Tamil film producers
Year of birth missing (living people)
Place of birth missing (living people)